Strongylognathus huberi is a species of ant in the genus Strongylognathus. It is found in Italy and Switzerland.

References

Strongylognathus
Hymenoptera of Europe
Insects described in 1874
Taxonomy articles created by Polbot